Mercy College may refer to:

 Mercy Catholic College, Chatswood, New South Wales, Australia
 Mercy College (Dublin), Ireland
 Mercy College, Sligo, Ireland
 Mercy College of Detroit, Michigan, since merged with the University of Detroit
 Mercy College (New York), Dobbs Ferry, New York, a private, non-sectarian, non-profit, coeducational research university   
 Mercy College (Perth), Western Australia
 Mercy College, Mackay, Queensland, Australia; see St Patrick's College, Mackay
 Mercy College of Health Sciences, Des Moines, Iowa
 Mercy College of Ohio, Toledo and Youngstown, Ohio

See also
 Our Lady of Mercy College (disambiguation)
 Gwynedd-Mercy College, Lower Gwynedd Township, Pennsylvania
 Gwynedd Mercy Academy High School, Lower Gwynedd Township, Pennsylvania
 Mercy Academy, Louisville, Kentucky
 Mercy Vocational High School, Philadelphia, Pennsylvania 
 Monte Sant' Angelo Mercy College, North Sydney, New South Wales, Australia
 Mt Lilydale Mercy College, Lilydale, Victoria
 Mount Mercy College, Cedar Rapids, Iowa
 Mount Mercy College, Cork, Ireland
 University of Detroit Mercy, a private, Roman Catholic co-educational university